Duck, duck, goose is a children's game.

Duck, duck, goose may also refer to:

Duck Duck Goose (film), a 2018 Chinese animated film
Duck, Duck, Goose!, a film short written and directed by D. C. Douglas
"Duck Duck Goose" (song), by Cupcakke
 Duck Duck Goose (Eureka), Eureka episode

See also
DuckDuckGo, an internet search engine